Sanford Calvin Yoder (December 5, 1879 – February 23, 1975) was a Mennonite pastor, biblical scholar, moderator of the Mennonite General Conference from 1919 to 1921, and president of Goshen College from 1923 to 1940. He was also a leader in the Mennonite conscientious objector movement surrounding World War I.

Publications
 Down South America Way (1943)
 Poetry of the Old Testament (Herald Press, Scottsdale PA, 1948)
 Eastward to the Sun (1953)
 Horse Trails Along the Desert (1954)
 Days of My Years (1959)
 If I Were Young Again (1963)
 He Gave Some Prophets (1964)

References

External links
 Mennonite Church USA Archives
 Obituary in The Gospel Herald

Nonviolence advocates
Goshen College faculty
Mennonite theologians
American biblical scholars
American Mennonites
Anabaptist biblical scholars
20th-century Mennonite bishops
1879 births
1975 deaths
Mennonite writers